Efraín Rivera Pérez (1951- 15 September 2013) born in Mayagüez, Puerto Rico, was a former Associate Justice on the Supreme Court of Puerto Rico. He held the position from 2000 to 2010. He died on 15 September 2013 in a motorcycle accident in Guaynabo, Puerto Rico.

Career
Rivera received his law degree from the Pontifical Catholic University of Puerto Rico. He served in various courts in Puerto Rico until 1992 when Governor Pedro Rosselló hired him to be his Legal Advisor. He also served as Deputy Secretary of Justice.

In 2000 he was appointed to the Supreme Court by Governor Rosselló. He took the oath of office on July 13, 2000 after confirmation by the Senate.  On June 2, 2010 he announced that he resigned his position, making the effective date of his resignation July 31, 2010. He was replaced by Appeals Court judge Edgardo Rivera García.

Two months later, Governor Luis Fortuño appointed him as a special monitor to oversee and make recommendations on the operations of the Puerto Rico Police Department, after over 60 of its agents were arrested following an FBI sting against police corruption.

References

1951 births
2013 deaths
Associate Justices of the Supreme Court of Puerto Rico
Road incident deaths in Puerto Rico
Motorcycle road incident deaths
People from Mayagüez, Puerto Rico
Pontifical Catholic University of Puerto Rico alumni
20th-century American judges